The Magog River, or Sekosonotek in Abenaki, is a river that drains Lake Memphremagog. It is a small river running through the territories of the cities of Magog and Sherbrooke, in the administrative region of Estrie, in Quebec, in Canada, along a southwest–northeast axis. Having its source in lake Memphremagog, it crosses lake Magog and empties into Saint-François River, in the city center of Sherbrooke.

The cities of Sherbrooke and Magog, Quebec, lie on the Magog River.

Engineers from the Université de Sherbrooke have constructed a plastic bridge on the river.

Geography 
The Magog course begins in the city center of the municipality of the same name.

At the first kilometer and a half of its route, there is a first dam, named Memphrémagog, followed by the collection of a first stream (km 4.1), named the Red stream. Downstream from this, a second dam (km 5.6), named La Grande-Dame is then interposed, then the river ends in the lake Magog (km 9.8).

The Magog River then resumes its normal course via a small interstice at the northeastern end of the lake (km 16.3).

The river continues its route collecting water from the Grass Island stream (km 18.5), Gordon (km 19.4) streams, before being interrupted again by the presence of Rock Forest dam (km 19.6). Subsequently, the Magog collects water from the streams Nick (km 21.5) Dodds (km 23), reaches the Drummond dam (km 25), before widening to form lac des Nations (km 29.1), in the heart of Sherbrooke.

Toponymy 
The Abenakis designate this watercourse under the name of: "Pskasewantekw" or "Pskusewantegw", meaning "the river which makes detours".

The toponym "rivière Magog" was made official on December 5, 1968 at the Commission de toponymie du Québec.

History 

The region was mapped by Joseph Blanchard in 1756. The significant drop allowed the construction of seven dams, three of which in the last  meters, even a gorge carved out by the river, in the heart of Sherbrooke. One of them, that of the Paton Co. created the Lac des Nations, a water basin formerly intended to provide leeway during low-water periods, in order to allow the continuous functioning of industrial companies, which used the hydraulic power of the river.

Due to its regular flow and its significant variation, it was the scene of various industrial activities, particularly in Sherbrooke and Magog, in the XIXth and XXth century. Today, its banks are mainly occupied by private residences, by linear parks, or by a few areas still wooded, industrial activities having almost all disappeared.

Dams

See also
List of rivers of Quebec

References

Further reading 
 Kesteman, Jean-Pierre (2004). Tout le long de la rivière Magog (All along the Magog River). Sherbrooke, Éditions GGC, 246 pages .

Rivers of Estrie
Landforms of Sherbrooke
Magog, Quebec